Antonio Caetani, seniore (1360–1412) was a Roman Catholic cardinal.

References

1360 births
1412 deaths
15th-century Italian cardinals
Clergy from Rome